The Technical University of Catalonia (UPC), currently referred to as BarcelonaTech, is the largest engineering university in Catalonia, Spain. It also offers programs in other disciplines such as mathematics and architecture.

UPC's objectives are based on internationalization, as it is one of Europe's technical universities with the most international PhD students and the university with the largest share of international master's degree students. UPC is a university aiming at achieving the highest degree of engineering/technical excellence and has bilateral agreements with several top-ranked European universities.

UPC is a member of the Top Industrial Managers for Europe network, which allows for student exchanges between leading European engineering schools. It is also a member of several university federations, including the Conference of European Schools for Advanced Engineering Education and Research (CESAER) and UNITECH. UPC is also a parent institution of the Institut Barcelona d'Estudis Internacionals (IBEI).

The university was founded in March 1971 as the Universitat Politècnica de Barcelona through the merger of engineering and architecture schools founded in the 19th century.  it has 25 schools in Catalonia located in the cities of Barcelona, Castelldefels, Manresa, Sant Cugat del Vallès, Terrassa, Igualada, Vilanova i la Geltrú and Mataró. As of the academic year 2017–18, the UPC has over 30,000 students and over 3,000 teaching and research staff, 65 undergraduate programs, 73 graduate programs and 49 doctorate programs.

Rankings 

UPC is consistently ranked as one of the leading European universities in the technology and engineering fields. U.S. News & World Report, for instance, ranks it as the world's 36th for Computer Science and 60th for Engineering. The QS World University Rankings also place the UPC among the world's 50 best universities in disciplines such as Architecture, Civil Engineering, Electrical and Electronic Engineering, Telecommunications Engineering, Instruments Science and Technology and Remote Sensing.

Schools 
 Barcelona East School of Engineering (EEBE)
 Castelldefels School of Telecommunications and Aerospace Engineering (EETAC)
 Barcelona School of Building Construction (EPSEB)
 Manresa School of Engineering (EPSEM)
 Vilanova i la Geltrú School of Engineering (EPSEVG)
 Barcelona School of Agricultural Engineering (ESAB)
 Terrassa School of Industrial, Aerospace and Audiovisual Engineering (ESEIAAT)
 Barcelona School of Architecture (ETSAB)
 Vallès School of Architecture (ETSAV)
 Barcelona School of Civil Engineering (ETSECCPB)
 School of Industrial Engineering of Barcelona (ETSEIB)
 Barcelona School of Informatics (FIB)
 Barcelona School of Telecommunications Engineering (ETSETB)
 School of Mathematics and Statistics (FME)
 Barcelona School of Nautical Studies (FNB)
 Terrassa School of Optics and Optometry (FOOT)
 Interdisciplinary Higher Education Centre (CFIS)
 Image Processing and Multimedia Technology Centre (CITM)

Affiliated Schools
 Institut Barcelona d'Estudis Internacionals (IBEI)
 Euncet University Business School (EUNCET)
 EAE University Business School (EAE)

UPC UNESCO Chairs 
 Càtedra UNESCO de Direcció Universitària (CUDU) – UNESCO Chair of Higher Education Management
 Càtedra UNESCO de Mètodes Numèrics en Enginyeria de la UPC – UNESCO Chair of Numerical Methods in Engineering
 Càtedra UNESCO de Sostenibilitat – UNESCO Sustainability Chair
 Càtedra UNESCO en Salut Visual i Desenvolupament – UNESCO Chair of Vision and Development
 Càtedra UNESCO en Tècnica i Cultura – UNESCO Chair of Technology and Culture

UPC Research Centers 
The UPC has a number of research centres.
 BSC – Barcelona Supercomputing Center
 CCABA – Advanced Broadband Communications Center
 CD6 – Centre for Sensors, Instruments and Systems Development
 CDPAC – Cen. de Documentació de Projectes d'Arquitectura de Catalunya
 CEBIM – Molecular Biotechnology Centre
 CERpIE – C. Recerca i Desenv. per a la Millora i Innov.de les Empreses
 CETpD-UPC -Tech. Research Cen. for Dependency Care and Autonomous Living
 CPSV- Centre of Land Policy and Valuations
 CRAE – Centre de Recerca de l'Aeronàutica i de l'Espai
 CRAHI – Centre de Recerca Aplicada en Hidrometeorologia
 CRAL – Centre for Research and Services for the Local Administration
 CIMNE – International Center for Numerical Methods in Engineering
 CREB – Biomedical Engineering Research Centre
 CREMIT – Center for Engines and Heat Installations
 CRNE – Centre for Research in Nanoengineering
 LACÀN – Specific Research Center of Numerical Methods in Applied Sciences and Engineering
 LIM/UPC – Maritime Engineering Laboratory
 LITEM – Laboratori per a la Innovació Tecnològica d'Estructures i Materials
 MCIA – Center Innovation Electronics. Motion Control and Industrial Applications
 PERC-UPC – Power Electronics Research Centre
 TALP – 
 TIEG – Terrassa Industrial Electronics Group

Science Fiction Award 
From 1991–2010, the Board of Trustees at the UPC organized and awarded an annual Science Fiction Award. Currently the award is presented bi-annually.

Previous winners include:
 2007: Brandon Sanderson, Defending Elysium; and Carlos Gardini d'Angelo, Belcebú en llamas
 2008: Eduardo Gallego Arjona and Guillem Sánchez Gómez, La cosecha del centauro
 2009: Roberto Sanhueza, Bis
 2010: José Miguel Sánchez Gómez (Yoss), Super extra grande
 2012: Miguel Santander, La epopeya de los amantes
 2014: Roberto Sanhueza, El año del gato

See also 
 Barcelona Supercomputing Center
 Knowledge Engineering and Machine Learning Group
 List of universities in Spain
 MareNostrum
 Vives Network

Notes and references

External links 
 Official website

 
1971 establishments in Spain
Educational institutions established in 1971
Engineering universities and colleges in Spain
Terrassa
Universities and colleges in Spain